The English-Speaking Union Moot, also known as, by virtue of a sponsorship arrangement with Essex Court Chambers, the ESU-Essex Court Chambers National Mooting Competition, or simply the ESU Moot, is the longest-running national mooting competition in the UK, involving teams of law students from universities across the country. The first grand final was held in 1972. The competition is run by Oxford Brookes University under the chairmanship of Eric Baskind, a visiting Research Fellow at the University. The President of the Competition is The Right Hon. Lady Arden of Heswall DBE, Justice of the UK Supreme Court.

History

In addition to being the oldest mooting competition, the ESU moot is also the largest of its kind, accepting entries from universities across the legal jurisdictions of the UK. Originally, the ESU moot was known as the Observer Moot, and has been known by its current name since 2000. Legal Week currently acts as the competition's media partner.

Format

The competition takes a knockout format, with 6 rounds, the last two of which take place on the same day. While the number of rounds require 64 participants, there is facility for more competitors than this, with special arrangements made to have pre-competition rounds to whittle the competitors down to 64.

Each round must be completed by a particular preset deadline, with one team being designated the host, and is thus responsible for securing a judge and organising facilities for the moot. All finalists and semi-finalists are presented with monetary prizes. In addition, the winners are awarded the Silver Mace, and the runner's up the Scarman Shield.

Previous winners

External links
 ESU-Essex Court National Mooting Competition Website

References

Moot court competitions
Legal education in the United Kingdom
Competitions in the United Kingdom